The 2011 Singaporean presidential election was held on 27 August 2011. Four eligible candidates were issued certificates of eligibility by the Presidential Elections Committee, and were nominated on Nomination Day, with Tony Tan defeating three other candidates in the popular vote.

Background

The president is the head of state of Singapore. Following the Westminster system, the position is largely ceremonial, but enjoys several reserve powers including withholding presidential assent on supply bills and changing or revoking civil service appointments. The current system of holding elections for the Presidency began with the 1993 election. Before then, the president was selected by Parliament.

There are strict requirements for prospective election candidates, and whether a candidate meets the qualifications or not is decided by the Election Department.

The Presidency, by the rules of the Constitution, requires a nonpartisan candidate/officeholder. However, in this election, three of the four candidates had connections to the dominant People's Action Party, and the fourth contested the recent 2011 general election under the banner of the Singapore Democratic Party.

Parliamentary reform
On 11 March 2010, the Government tabled three bills in the parliament to amend the Constitution, the Presidential Elections Act and the Parliamentary Elections Act. A one-day "cooling-off" day was implemented, during which campaigning was forbidden, with only party political broadcasts allowed. Internet campaigning was also formally legalised as a legitimate means of political campaigning. On 26 April 2010, the amendments to the Constitution were passed by a vote of 74–1 after a three-hour debate on the bill.

Nomination Day for eligible candidates was held on 17 August 2011. Four candidates were issued certificates of eligibility by Singapore's Presidential Elections Committee, and all four were nominated on Nomination Day. With 2,153,014 local votes and 3,375 overseas votes cast, this was also the biggest democratic exercise in Singapore to date.

Candidates

Eligible

Declared ineligible

Declined

Endorsements
In alphabetical order:

Tan Cheng Bock
Tan Cheng Bock received a formal endorsement from the Singapore Baseball and Softball Association.

Tan Jee Say
Tan Jee Say was endorsed by Nicole Seah from the National Solidarity Party (NSP), as well as Vincent Wijeysingha, Jeannette Chong-Aruldoss, Steve Chia, and candidate-hopeful Andrew Kuan (who was not awarded a COE). He also received an endorsement from the political website Temasek Review Emeritus.

Tony Tan
As of 20 August 2011, Tony Tan was endorsed by:
 21 unions (including the Transport and Logistics cluster, the Marine and Machinery Engineering cluster, and the Infocomm and Media cluster) which collectively represent about 112,000 workers
 Singapore Chinese Chamber of Commerce and Industry (SCCCI)
 Singapore Malay Chamber of Commerce and Industry (SMCCI)
 Singapore Indian Chamber of Commerce and Industry (SICCI)
 Federation of Tan Clan Associations with 10,000 members
 Singapore Federation of Chinese Clan Associations (SFCCA)
 Nine Teochew clan associations

Tan Kin Lian
Tan Kin Lian did not receive any group endorsements. He said during a walkabout in Tiong Bahru, "I met so many people here today. They tell me they want to support me, they tell me 'Mr Tan, please don't drop out, give us a chance to vote'. So I want to be endorsed by the people."

Timeline
All the dates and time reflected in this timeline are in Local Singaporean Time (SST).

Analysis
Various analysts said that while George Yeo is still a PAP member (the Constitution prohibits the president from having party membership), his popularity seems to have survived his defeat at Aljunied GRC. Some analysts noted that should Yeo decide to run, he should be well-suited for the Presidency, noting that he has served in various cabinet positions. Others were critical of the speed with which Yeo announced his intention not to contest in future his lost parliamentary seat, his comments about being "temperamentally" unsuited to the presidency, and the likely difficulty of him claiming any independence from the PAP in a contested election.

After Yeo declined to run for the Presidency, political analysts said Tony Tan would be one of the more suitable candidates, even though Tan himself had yet to declare his candidacy at that time.

Reaction
Since late June, Minister for Law K. Shanmugam expressed concerns that voters and prospective candidates were confusing or misinterpreting the president's powers, and clarified what the office could and could not do. In August, he said at a forum, "The president can speak on issues only as authorised by the Cabinet” and that “[he] must follow the advice of the Cabinet in the discharge of his duties." He also said, "If [the president] is someone who commands little or no respect of the prime minister, then of course influence will be limited." The then six presidential hopefuls commented on his remarks on the presidential role.

In an e-mail to reporters from the Chinese-language newspaper Lianhe Zaobao in early July, Prime Minister Lee Hsien Loong praised Tony Tan's performance during his time in Cabinet, and stopping short of an outright endorsement, said that should Tony Tan be elected president, he would be able to unite Singaporeans, and bring honour to the country.

In early August, Minister of National Development Khaw Boon Wan echoed Lee Hsien Loong's sentiments on Tony Tan at a National Day banquet in Sembawang, stating that he will be an excellent president, and make the nation proud. In what could be construed as an endorsement, Khaw publicly wished Tony Tan will win the Presidency.

In a break with the past, National Trades Union Congress (NTUC) President and Member of Parliament Lim Swee Say said the NTUC will not force all its constituent trades union to endorse one candidate, and that the constituent trades union may endorse any candidate as they desire.

Campaigning
Campaigning, on a widespread scale, did not happen until late July. The first instance of a campaign reportedly happened on 17 June, when Shin Min Daily News reported that Tan Cheng Bock was starting to meet voters at various bazaars in Singapore.

On 1 August, Shin Min Daily News reported that four of the presidential candidates were meeting with voters over the preceding weekend. Tan Kin Lian went to Batam, Indonesia, to meet with Singaporeans in the region, while Tan Cheng Bock was meeting with young voters at a local youth park.

On 7 August, Lianhe Zaobao reported that Tan Cheng Bock had visited at least 10 neighbourhoods in Singapore, and planned to visit more.

There are spending limits for all Singaporean elections. A presidential candidate may not spend more than SG$600,000, or 30 cents per elector, whichever amount is greater. Overspending incurs a $2,000 fine, as well as disqualification from running or voting in any elections for 3 years.

On 8 July, Prime Minister Lee Hsien Loong issued a statement on presidential campaigns. He said campaigning for the presidential election will mostly be done on television, due to its reach. Each candidate will be given two 10-minute blocks of free airtime in the form of a presidential candidate broadcast (PCB). The PCBs would be translated. The PCBs would be aired on the 18 and 26 August, respectively. Additionally, MediaCorp would produce a series of programme on the candidates.

After all four candidates were successfully nominated on 17 August, their respective slogans and symbols were revealed, as follows:

Voting
On 3 August, the Singapore government announced that polling day would be 27 August.

A total of 2,274,773 voters were eligible to vote in the elections, though the actual turnout (overseas voting exclusive) were 2,153,014 (2,115,188 votes were valid). It was also announced that voters would be casting votes on "ballot papers which carry each presidential candidate's photograph as well as a graphic image of an object chosen by the candidate". This was to allow Singaporean voters to recognise the presidential candidates more easily when marking their choice on the paper.

For the first time, voters could print out their polling cards from the Elections Department website if they do not receive them in the mail.

A total of 150,729 Singaporeans were expunged from the voting list for not voting in the 2011 general election, while around 71,000 names have been reinstated.

Voting is compulsory in Singapore. Voters whose name was expunged from the voting list would be ineligible to vote in future presidential or parliamentary elections, in addition to being ineligible to contest these elections. Voters can apply to be reinstated to the Register of Electors, but a S$50 fine is imposed on those who did not vote without a valid reason.

Results
At 8.00 pm, polling stations closed and ballot boxes were then sealed, and delivered to counting centres. The first candidate to concede defeat was Tan Kin Lian at about 10.30 pm local time, around two and a half hours after polls closed. He added he might not get his deposit of S$48,000 back but the experience of running the race has been useful. He said he was somewhat disappointed, but he believed he had put up a good fight and expected to do much better. He made a hint of the result by saying it "will be a tough fight between the top two candidates". When asked who the top two candidates were, Tan declined to comment.

At 1.19 am on 28 August, it was announced by the Elections Department that a recount of ballots would begin, as the top two candidates, Tony Tan and Tan Cheng Bock's votes had a difference of less than 2 percent.  The Returning Officer "allowed the recounting of all votes cast" after the first tally showed they were less than two percent apart, per the statement.

At 4.23 am SST, the results were released by Returning Officer Yam Ah Mee at the Elections Department at Prinsep Street.

Result for the presidential election 2011. Tan Cheng Bock, 737,128 votes (34.85%/125.46°). Tan Jee Say, 529,732 votes (25.04%/90.16°). Tony Tan Keng Yam, 744,397 votes (35.19%/126.69°). Tan Kin Lian, 103,931 votes (4.91%/17.69°). Rejected votes, 37,826. Total votes cast, 2,153,014. The local votes counted are conclusive of the results. Pursuant to Section 32, Subsection 8D, Paragraph A of the Presidential Elections Act, I declare Tony Tan Keng Yam as the candidate elected as the President of Singapore.

Tony Tan was declared president-elect with 35.19%/126.7° of the votes, leading by a 0.34%/1.22° margin ahead of Tan Cheng Bock, or 7,269 votes. Tan Kin Lian, who polled under 5%/18° of the 2,115,188 valid votes cast, had his election deposit of S$48,000 forfeited.

Post-election events

Reactions of candidates
Subsequently, Tony Tan made his thank you speech at Toa Payoh Stadium, and pledged to work for all Singaporeans. He also thanked the other three candidates who "have campaigned with vigour, giving Singaporeans a choice". At a subsequent press conference that afternoon, Tony Tan emphasised that the president works for all Singaporeans and he will not be an "ivory tower President", just as President S.R. Nathan was not. When asked his thoughts about the tight race and his winning margin of just 0.34 percentage points over his closest rival Tan Cheng Bock, Tony Tan said his results were "decisive" in Singapore's first past-the-post system.

Subsequently, Tan Cheng Bock held a press conference in the afternoon as well. Speaking to the media at his first news conference following the presidential election results, Tan Cheng Bock said he wanted to continue unifying Singaporeans. He planned to continue engaging Singaporeans through social media such as his Facebook page and blog by making comments and suggestions. He said this was where the majority of youth lie and he believes they need to be better informed. Tan Cheng Bock announced his intention to return to his medical practice and did not rule out the possibility of running again for the next presidential election in 2017.

As for the third placed candidate Tan Jee Say, he released a statement in the afternoon of 28 August and said he looked forward to Tony Tan performing the duties and responsibilities of the office of president in a fair and honourable manner. He also congratulated Tan Cheng Bock and Tan Kin Lian "for their earnest campaign". Earlier in the morning after the results were announced, Tan Jee Say said although he had lost the election, it was still a "victory of hearts" in a press conference because by standing up to be counted, a voice was given to Singaporeans that will continue to be heard. When asked whether he would rejoin the Singapore Democratic Party, he said he had not made up his mind to do so.

Reaction of the Prime Minister
Prime Minister Lee Hsien Loong, in a statement released from his office soon after the declaration of results, said the election has been an intensely fought election, and the result was very close. Lee said both Tony Tan and Tan Cheng Bock (who had the next highest number of votes) conveyed strong unifying messages and declared their intention to work closely with the government. Both had long records of public service but was "reassuring that Singaporean voters recognised and valued their strengths, as well as their inclusive approach". He called Tony Tan to congratulate him on his election and assure him of "his government's full cooperation" and also called Tan Cheng Bock to thank him and his supporters for "having fought an effective and dignified campaign".

Calls for voting reform
The Reform Party, an opposition political party, released a statement on its website on 28 August. While congratulating Tony Tan on his election, it stated that a two-round system should be implemented in place of first-past-the-post voting. It proposed that a runoff election should be held a week later after the first round in future elections. In addition, the statement added: "the President should unite Singaporeans of all political persuasions and views. To do this he needs to be elected by a clear majority of votes cast and not just on an almost statistically insignificant difference between him and the runner-up."

Counting of overseas votes
On 31 August, the 5,504 overseas votes were counted. Out of the 3,375 votes cast, a combined 3,352 votes were valid. Tony Tan, Tan Cheng Bock, Tan Jee Say and Tan Kin Lian each receiving 1,296, 1,183, 709, and 164 votes, respectively (the voting percentages for the overseas votes were 38.66%, 35.29%, 21.15% and 4.89%, respectively). The overall percentage of the vote share inclusive of overseas votes were virtually unchanged.

Returning Officer Yam Ah Mee thanked the more than 20,000 election officials who participated in the exercise from Nomination Day to the Polling Day to the counting process; in addition the efficiency of the officials allowed over two million local votes to be counted. Both Tony Tan and Tan Cheng Bock, and a representative for Tan Jee Say, Jeannette Chong-Aruldoss, turned up at the People's Association Headquarters on the afternoon to witness the counting.

Tony Tan thanked all the overseas voters who turned up to cast their vote while Tan Cheng Bock expressed that he was pleasantly surprised at the result as he expected Tony Tan to garner a higher percentage of overseas votes.

Presidential inauguration
At 7.30pm SST of 1 September, outgoing president S.R. Nathan received his final presidential salute from members of the Singapore Armed Forces at the Istana, before he left office with his wife Urmila Nandey to retire to his home in East Coast. Later, Tony Tan arrived with his wife Mary Chee and at 8.00pm SST, Tan was sworn in as president at the Istana, in the presence of the diplomatic corps, the Cabinet, selected guests and Members of Parliament. Tan said in his speech: "I will wield this 'second key' with utmost care. Our reserves have been painstakingly built up over decades, and should not be compromised. Our government must continue to live within its means, and only draw on past reserves in an exceptional crisis - like the one we faced in 2008. I therefore welcome the Prime Minister's assurance that the government will continue to be responsible with our finances. I will play my role to safeguard our reserves, so that they can continue to give us confidence in tough times." This was in reference to the custodial powers of the Singapore presidency, in which the president acts as a fiscal guardian to the national reserves. Tan added he can be both a resource and a symbol and would offer the Prime Minister his confidential advice on government policies and engage all Singaporeans to understand their interests and concerns.

Margin of victory
According to Singapore Elections, an archive of Singapore election results, a post made on its Facebook page stated that the presidential election of 2011 "has established a new record of the second-narrowest percentage margin in history, after River Valley in the 1959 elections (margin of around 0.05%) and beating Sepoy Lines in the 1957 city elections (margin of around 0.4%)". In comparison, the margin of victory for Tony Tan was only 0.35% over his closest rival Tan Cheng Bock.

References
Notes

External links

 Official website of the Elections Department

Singapore
Presidential election
Presidential elections in Singapore
Non-partisan elections